During the 1904–05 season Hibernian, a football club based in Edinburgh, finished fifth out of 14 clubs in the Scottish First Division.

Scottish First Division

Final League table

Scottish Cup

See also
List of Hibernian F.C. seasons

References

External links
Hibernian 1904/1905 results and fixtures, Soccerbase

Hibernian F.C. seasons
Hibernian